The Chess'n Math Association (or Chess and Math Association) is a non-profit organization dedicated to bringing chess into Canadian schools. Founded in 1985 by Larry Bevand, who still serves as its executive director, it bills itself as "Canada's National Scholastic Chess Organization", although it is not affiliated with the Chess Federation of Canada, Canada's official FIDE-recognized chess organization. Chess'n Math runs hundreds of tournaments for kids K-12 across Canada, including an annual Canadian Chess Challenge. These tournaments are rated according to its own rating system. It also offers chess lessons and camps, produces a magazine Scholar's Mate, and runs the Strategy game stores located in Montreal, Ottawa and Toronto. CMA has sponsored several chess futurity events, to provide international title norm opportunities for promising young Canadian players.

Publications
Leçons d'échecs du Tournoi International de Montréal 2001 by IM Jean Hébert
Le Livre du Tournoi International de Montréal 2002 by IM Jean Hébert
Chess Strategy for Kids by Jeff Coakley
Winning Chess Exercises for Kids by Jeff Coakley
Winning Chess Puzzles for Kids by Jeff Coakley
Nick's Best by IM Lawrence Day about IM Bryon Nickoloff
 Chess on the Edge by GM Yasser Seirawan and FM Bruce Harper, the games of GM Duncan Suttles in three volumes.

Rating System

The Chess 'n Math rating system does not differ from that of the FIDE a lot in the way that the formula is derived, but the variables are different. According to their website, the formula is as follows, for one tournament or multi-game event:

 Where W is the number of wins, L is the number of losses, and D is the difference in rating (your opponent's minus yours), with a cutoff value of ±350.

As it appears, the number of "expected wins" for one game is equal to the difference in rating divided by 800, plus 0.5. The cutoff value of ±350 makes the limits of these "We" values, 15/16 and 1/16 respectively. A person can also win bonus points equal to:

 for doing extremely well in a series of games. (G stands for number of games played).

As of September 1, 2007, a "bonus" of 2 is added to every game won, up to a maximum of 50 games.

References

External links
 The official website
 Strategy Games

Chess organizations
Chess in Canada
1985 in chess
Sports organizations established in 1985
1985 establishments in Canada